This is a list of inhabited places in Germany which are named after people. The etymology is generally referenced in the article about the person or the place.

A
Adelheidsdorf (state of Lower Saxony) – Queen Adelaide of Hanover, Great Britain and Ireland (est. in 1831 in drained former Wietzenbruch swamp)
 Adolf-Wenz-Siedlung (State of Bavaria) - Adolf Wenz (1840-1927), businessman
 (state of Lower Saxony) – Prince Adolphus, Duke of Cambridge, Viceroy of Hanover (est. 1800, incorporated into Grasberg in 1974.) 
Agathenburg (state of Lower Saxony) – Agathe von Leesten/Lehsten, wife of Bremen-Verden's general governor Hans Christoff von Königsmarck.
Annaburg (state of Saxony-Anhalt) – Princess Anna of Denmark and Norway (1532–1585), electress consort of Augustus the Strong 
Augsburg (state of Bavaria) – Roman Caesar Augustus
Augustdorf (state of North Rhine-Westphalia) – Simon August, Count of Lippe-Detmold (est. 1779, named after the count in 1789).
Augustendorf (state of Lower Saxony) – Princess Augusta of Hesse-Kassel, consort of Prince Adolphus, Duke of Cambridge, Viceroy of Hanover (est. 1827, incorporated into Gnarrenburg in 1974.) 
Augustusburg (state of Saxony) – Augustus, Elector of Saxony

B
Bad Karlshafen (state of Hesse) – Charles I, Landgrave of Hesse-Kassel 
Bad Wilhelmshöhe  (state of Hesse) – William I, Elector of Hesse (a quarter of today's Kassel) 
Benediktbeuern (state of Bavaria) – Benedict of Nursia
Borsigwalde (state of Berlin) – engineer August Borsig (est. 1898, incorporated into Berlin on 1 October 1920.) 
Brunswick (state of Lower Saxony) – Bruno, Duke of Saxony

C
Cäciliengroden (state of Lower Saxony) – Princess Cecilia of Sweden (1807–1844), grand duchess consort to Grand Duke Frederick Augustus I of Oldenburg (est. 1844 and settled 1938/39, incorporated into Sande in Frisia)
Carlsburg (state of Bremen) – Charles XI of Sweden (est. 1672, incorporated into Bremerhaven in 1827)
Charlottenburg (state of Berlin) – Princess Sophia Charlotte of Hanover, queen consort of King Frederick I of Prussia (est. 13th century, incorporated into Berlin on 1 October 1920) 
Christian-Albrechts-Koog (state of Schleswig-Holstein) – Christian Albert, Duke of Holstein-Gottorp (since 1974 a part of Galmsbüll)
Clemenshammer (state of North Rhine-Westphalia) – Clemens auf dem Hammer, purchaser of ironworks in 1580 (est. before 1580, incorporated into Remscheid in 1929)
Claudian colony and sacrificial altar of the Agrippinensians) 
Constance (state of Baden-Württemberg) – Roman Emperor Constantius Chlorus

D
Dorotheenstadt (state of Berlin) – Duchess Sophia Dorothea of Holstein, electress consort of Frederick William, the "Great Elector" of Brandenburg (est. 1674, incorporated into Berlin on 1 January 1710)
 Dr.-Kurt-Fischer-Siedlung (State of Saxony) - Kurt Fischer (1900-1950), politician

E
Elisabeth-Sophien-Koog (state of Schleswig-Holstein) – Elisabeth Sophie Desmercières, wife of Jean Henri Desmercières, financier of the polder and dike constructions
 Erichsburg (state of Lower Saxony) – Eric II, Duke of Brunswick and Lunenburg, founded in the 16th century by his father Eric I, Duke of Brunswick and Lunenburg, who named it after his son.
Erkelenz (state of North Rhine-Westphalia) – Roman real proprietor Herculentiacus
 Ernst-Braune-Siedlung (state of Saxony) - Ernst Braune (1853-1942), social democratic politician
 Ernst-Thälmann-Siedlung (state of Mecklenburg-Vorpommern) - Ernst Thälmann

F
Ferdinandshof (state of Mecklenburg-Hither Pomerania) – Prince Augustus Ferdinand of Prussia
Findorf (state of Lower Saxony) – , Moor Commissioner in charge of drainage, cultivation and colonisation of moorlands (est. 1780, incorporated into Gnarrenburg in 1974)
Franzburg (state of Mecklenburg-Hither Pomerania) – Francis, Duke of Brunswick and Lunenburg (Gifhorn line) (est. 1587 by Bogislaw XIII, Duke of Pomerania and named in honour of his father-in-law.) 
Friedrichsfelde (state of Berlin) – Prince-Elector Frederick III of Brandenburg (est. 13th century, incorporated into Berlin on 1 October 1920) 
Friedrichshafen (state of Baden-Württemberg) – King Frederick of Württemberg
Friedrichshagen (state of Berlin) – King Frederick II, the "Great", of Prussia (est. 1753, incorporated into Berlin on 1 October 1920)
Friedrichshain (state in Berlin) – King Frederick II, the "Great", of Prussia
Friedrichskoog (state of Schleswig-Holstein) – King Frederick VII of Denmark
Friedrichsruh (state of Schleswig-Holstein) – Count Frederick Charles Augustus of Lippe-Biesterfeld, Sternberg and Schwalenberg (est. 1763)
Friedrichstadt (state of Schleswig-Holstein) – Frederick III, Duke of Holstein-Gottorp (est. 1621)
Friedrichstadt (state of Berlin) – King Frederick I of Prussia (est. 1688, incorporated into Berlin on 1 January 1710)
Friedrichsthal (state of Brandenburg) – King Frederick II, the "Great", of Prussia, now a component locality of Gartz
Friedrichsthal (state of Brandenburg) – King Frederick I of Prussia, now a component locality of Oranienburg
Friedrichsthal (state of Saarland) – Frederick Louis, Count of Nassau-Ottweiler (est. 1723)
Friedrichswalde (state of Brandenburg) – King Frederick II, the "Great", of Prussia
Friedrichswerder (state of Berlin) – Frederick William, the "Great Elector" of Brandenburg (est. 1662, incorporated into Berlin on 1 January 1710)
Friedrich-Wilhelm-Lübke-Koog (state of Schleswig-Holstein) – Minister-President Friedrich-Wilhelm Lübke  of Schleswig-Holstein
Friedrich-Wilhelm-Stadt (state of Berlin) – King Frederick William III of Prussia (est. after 1710, a locality of Berlin from the beginning)

G
Galmsbüll//North Frisian: Galmsbel (state of Schleswig-Holstein) – Saint Gall (first mentioned in the 13th century)
Georgensgmünd (state of Bavaria) – George the Martyr
Georgenthal (state of Thuringia) – George the Martyr
Georgsdorf (state of Lower Saxony) – George V of Hanover (est. 1775, named in 1890 in memory of the king)
Georgsmarienhütte (state of Lower Saxony) – King George V of Hanover and Duchess Mary of Saxe-Altenburg, the queen consort
Giesensdorf (state of Berlin) – a certain Ghiselbrecht, the locator  (chief settler, who gathered interested colonists) in the 13th century (incorporated into Berlin on 1 October 1920)
Gustavsburg (state of Hesse) – King Gustavus Adolphus of Sweden (est. 1632, merged into Ginsheim-Gustavsburg in 1808)
Gropiusstadt (State of Berlin) - Walter Gropius

H
Hedwigenkoog (state of Schleswig-Holstein) – Hedvig Sophia of Sweden
Heinrichswalde (state of Mecklenburg-Hither Pomerania) – Christoph Ludwig Henrici
Hermsdorf (state of Berlin) – a certain Herman, the locator  (chief settler, who gathered interested colonists) around 1200 (incorporated into Berlin on 1 October 1920)
Hildesheim (state of Lower Saxony) – farmer Hildwin (landowner in the 10th century)
Hindenburg, Saxony-Anhalt – Paul von Hindenburg, President of Germany

J
Joachimsthal in Brandenburg (state of Brandenburg) – Joachim Frederick, Elector of Brandenburg 
Johanngeorgenstadt (state of Saxony) – John George I, Elector of Saxony
Johannisthal (state of Berlin) – Johann Wilhelm Werner, councillor of the electoral chamber (financial department), (est. 18th century, incorporated into Berlin on 1 October 1920) 
Juliers (state of North Rhine-Westphalia;) – Julius Caesar 
Jürgensgaard/Jørgensgård (state of Schleswig-Holstein) – George the Martyr (incorporated into Flensburg in 1900.)
Jürgenstorf (state of Mecklenburg-Hither Pomerania) – a certain Jürgen, the locator  (chief settler, who gathered interested colonists) in the 13th century

K
Kaiser-Wilhelm-Koog (state of Schleswig-Holstein) – German Emperor William I
Karlsburg in Hither Pomerania (state of Mecklenburg-Hither Pomerania) – feudal landlord Carl von Bismarck
Karlsruhe (state of Baden-Württemberg) – Margrave Charles III William, Margrave of Baden-Durlach 
Karolinenkoog (state of Schleswig-Holstein) – Princess Caroline of Denmark
Kilianstädten (state of Hesse) – Irish Franconian apostle Saint Kilian (incorporated into today's Schöneck in Hesse in 1971)
Kronprinzenkoog (state of Schleswig-Holstein) – Crown Prince Frederick of Denmark
Kaiserslautern  (state of Rhineland-Palatinate) Holy Roman Emperor Frederick I, Holy Roman Emperor

L
Leopoldshafen (state of Baden-Württemberg) – Leopold, Grand Duke of Baden (originally Schröck, first mentioned in 1160, renamed on 4 June 1833)
Leopoldshagen (state of Mecklenburg-Hither Pomerania) – Leopold II, Prince of Anhalt-Dessau (est. 1748, named 1752)
Leopoldshöhe (state of North Rhine-Westphalia) – Leopold II, Prince of Lippe
Leverkusen (state of North Rhine-Westphalia) – pharmacist Carl Leverkus
Ludwigsau (state of Hesse) – Louis I, Landgrave of Hesse
Ludwigsburg (state of Baden-Württemberg) – Eberhard Ludwig, Duke of Württemberg
Ludwigsfelde (state of Brandenburg) – Ernst Ludwig von der Gröben (1703–1773), president of the chamber (financial department) of Kurmark
Ludwigshafen upon Lake Constance (state of Baden-Württemberg) – Louis I, Grand Duke of Baden
Ludwigshafen upon Rhine (state of Rhineland-Palatinate) – King Louis I of Bavaria
Ludwigshöhe in the Palatinate (state of Rhineland-Paltinate) – King Louis I of Bavaria 
Ludwigshöhe in Rhenish Hesse (state of Rhineland-Paltinate) – Louis I, Grand Duke of Hesse
Ludwigslust (state of Mecklenburg-Hither Pomerania) – Duke Christian Louis II of Mecklenburg-Schwerin
Ludwigsstadt (state of Bavaria) – a certain Ludewich, bailiff in 1269
Luisenstadt (state of Berlin) – Duchess Louise of Mecklenburg-Strelitz, queen consort of King Frederick William III of Prussia (est. 16th century, incorporated into Berlin on 1 January 1710)
Luisenthal (state of Thuringia) – Louise Dorothy of Saxe-Meiningen, duchess consort of Frederick III, Duke of Saxe-Gotha-Altenburg

M
Mariendorf (state of Berlin) – Mary of Nazareth (est. 13th century, incorporated into Berlin on 1 October 1920)
Marienfelde (state of Berlin) – Mary of Nazareth (est. 13th century, incorporated into Berlin on 1 October 1920)
Maxau (state of Baden-Württemberg) – Prince Maximilian of Baden (son of Charles Frederick, Grand Duke of Baden)
Maxdorf (state of Rhineland-Palatinate) – King Maximilian I Joseph of Bavaria (est. mid-18th century, named after the king in 1819)
Maxhafen (state of North Rhine-Westphalia) – Maximilian Frederick of Königsegg-Rothenfels, prince-archbishop-elector of Cologne, duke of Westphalia and prince-bishop of Münster (est. c. 1771, incorporated into Wettringen in the Münsterland)
Maxhütte (state of Bavaria) – Maximilian II Joseph of Bavaria
Maximiliansau (state of Rhineland-Palatinate) – Maximilian II Joseph of Bavaria (1858 a locality of Pfortz was named after the king, in 1938 the name of the locality was adopted for entire Pfortz, incorporated into the city of Wörth upon Rhine in 1979)
Moritzburg (state of Saxony) – Maurice, Elector of Saxony

N
Neuhardenberg (state of Brandenburg) – chancellor Karl August von Hardenberg
Neu Sankt Jürgen  (state of Lower Saxony) – George the Martyr (incorporated into Worpswede in 1974)
Nikolassee (state of Berlin) – Bishop Nicolas of Myra, (est. 1901, incorporated into Berlin on 1 October 1920) 
Nikolskoë (state of Berlin) – Tzar Nicholas I of Russia, (est. 1819, incorporated into Berlin on 1 October 1920) 
Nordgeorgsfehn (state of Lower Saxony) – George IV of Hanover and the United Kingdom (est. 1825, incorporated into Uplengen in 1973)

O
Oederquart (state of Lower Saxony) – a certain Oderick, the locator  (chief settler, who gathered interested colonists) in the 12th century 
Oranienbaum (state of Saxony-Anhalt) – Princess Henriette Catherina of Orange-Nassau, princess consort of John George II, Prince of Anhalt-Dessau
Oranienburg (state of Brandenburg) – Princess Luise Henriette of Orange-Nassau, electress consort of Frederick William, the "Great Elector" of Brandenburg 
Ottobrunn (state of Bavaria) – Othon, King of the Hellenes
 Otto-Suhr-Siedlung (State of Berlin) - Otto Suhr (1894-1957), Mayor of Berlin

P
Paulinenaue (state of Brandenburg) – Pauline von Bardeleben (1811–1884), bride of the patrimonial landlord Friedrich Wilhelm von Knoblauch (1798–1852)
Philippinenburg (state of Hesse) – Margravine Philippine of Brandenburg-Schwedt, second wife of Frederick II, Landgrave of Hesse-Cassel (est. 1778, incorporated into Wolfhagen in 1971)
Philippinendorf (state of Hesse) – Margravine Philippine of Brandenburg-Schwedt, second wife of Frederick II, Landgrave of Hesse-Cassel (est. 1778, incorporated into Wolfhagen in 1971)
Philippinenthal (state of Hesse) – Margravine Philippine of Brandenburg-Schwedt, second wife of Frederick II, Landgrave of Hesse-Cassel (est. 1778, incorporated into Wolfhagen in 1971)
Philippsburg (state of Baden-Württemberg) – Prince-Bishop Philipp Christoph von Sötern, Prince-Bishopric of Speyer
Philippsthal upon Werra (state of Hesse) – Philip, Landgrave of Hesse-Philippsthal
Pirmasens (state of Rhineland-Palatinate) – monk Pirminius

R
Ratzeburg (state of Schleswig-Holstein) – Prince Ratibor (11th century)
Reinickendorf (state of Berlin) – a certain Reineke, the locator  (chief settler, who gathered interested colonists) in the 13th century (incorporated into Berlin on 1 October 1920)
Reußenköge (state of Schleswig-Holstein) – Count Heinrich XLIII of Reuß-Schleiz-Köstritz and his wife Louise, who financed the polders
Rixdorf (state of Berlin) – a certain Richard, the locator  (chief settler, who gathered interested colonists) in 1360 (incorporated into Berlin on 1 October 1920)
Röntgental (state of Brandenburg) – physicist Wilhelm Röntgen, inventor of the X-ray

S
Saarlouis (state of Saarland) – King Louis XIV of France
Sankt Augustin (state of North Rhine-Westphalia) – Augustine of Hippo
Sankt Pauli (state of Hamburg) – (Saul) Paul of Tarsos
Schmargendorf (state of Berlin; antiq. (de)s Margreven Dorp, Smargendorp, lit. the Margrave's Village) – Margrave John I of Brandenburg, (est. in the 13th century, incorporated into Berlin on 1 October 1920)
Schrötersdorf (state of Lower Saxony) – astronomer Johann Hieronymus Schröter (est. 1805, incorporated into Lilienthal in 1974)
Siemensstadt (state of Berlin) – engineer Werner von Siemens (est. 1899, incorporated into Berlin on 1 October 1920)
Südgeorgsfehn (state of Lower Saxony) – George IV of Hanover and the United Kingdom (est. 1825, incorporated into Uplengen in 1973)

T
Trier (state of Rhineland-Palatinate) – Augustus (lit. City of Augustus in the lands of the Treveri people)

U
Ulrichshusen  (state of Mecklenburg-Hither Pomerania) – feudal landlord Ulrich von Moltzan (now a part of Schwinkendorf)

V
Veitshöchheim (state of Bavaria) – Vitus
Viereck (state of Mecklenburg-Hither Pomerania) – , Prussian state minister in charge of colonists in the monarchy (est. in 1748, renamed in 1751)

W
Waldensberg (state of Hesse) – merchant Peter Waldo, precursor of the Protestant Reformers (est. 1699, incorporated into Wächtersbach in 1971)
Wedding (state of Berlin) – feudal landlord Rudolf de Weddinge (est. 13th century, incorporated into Berlin in 1861)
Wilhelmsburg (state of Hamburg) – Duke George William of Brunswick and Lunenburg, Prince of Lüneburg (est. 1672, incorporated into Harburg-Wilhelmsburg in 1927)
Wilhelmsdorf in Middle Franconia (state of Bavaria) – George William, Margrave of Brandenburg-Bayreuth
Wilhelmsdorf upon Saale (state of Thuringia) – a certain Wilhelm, probably the locator  (chief settler, who gathered interested colonists) in the 14th century
Wilhelmsdorf in Württemberg (state of Baden-Württemberg) – King William I of Württemberg
Wilhelmshaven (state of Lower Saxony) – King William I of Prussia, later also German Emperor (lit. William's harbour)
Wilmersdorf (state of Berlin) – a certain Wilhelm, probably the locator  (chief settler, who gathered interested colonists) in the 13th century (incorporated into Berlin on 1 October 1920)
Wittenau (state of Berlin) – mayor , (est. 14th century, incorporated into Berlin on 1 October 1920)

Z
Zeppelinheim (state of Hesse) – Count Ferdinand von Zeppelin (est. 1 January 1938, incorporated into Neu-Isenburg in 1977.)<ref>Jakob Sprenger, "Erlaß des Reichsstatthalters in Hessen über die Bildung der Gemeinde Zeppelinheim (31 December 1937), in: Hessisches Regierungsblatt, No. 2 (1938), pp. 9seq. (pdf file, there p. 12).</ref>

Former namesHorst-Wessel-Stadt (locality of Berlin) was the name of Berlin-Friedrichshain from 1933 to 1945 – Horst WesselKarl-Marx-Stadt (state of Saxony) was the name of Chemnitz from 1953 to 1990 – Karl MarxKatharinenthal (state of Hesse) was the name of Wilhelmsthal from 1807 to 1813 – Catharina of Württemberg, Queen consort of WestphaliaMaczków (state of Lower Saxony) was the name of Haren upon Ems between 4 June 1945 and 10 September 1948 – Stanisław MaczekMarxwalde (state of Brandenburg) was the name of Neuhardenberg from 1949 to 1990 – Karl MarxNapoléonshöhe (state of Hesse) was the name of Bad Wilhelmshöhe (a quarter of today's Cassel) – Napoléon BonapartePottsfehn (state of Lower Saxony) was the name of Hüllenerfehn (since 1973 a part of Ihlow in East Frisia) – Rudolf Pott, founderStalinstadt'' (state of Brandenburg) was the name of Eisenhüttenstadt from 1953 to 1961 – Joseph Stalin

References

See also
List of places named after people
List of country subdivisions named after people
List of islands named after people
Buildings and structures named after people
List of eponyms of airports
List of convention centers named after people
List of railway stations named after people
Lists of places by eponym
List of eponyms
Lists of etymologies

Lists of eponyms
Lists of places named after people
People